Aguirre Department is a department of Santiago del Estero Province, Argentina. The capital lies at Pinto.

The department covers an area of 3692 km². The population as of 2010 was 7,610. Municipalities include Argentina, Casares and Malbrán.

Departments of Santiago del Estero Province